Dabaozi, may refer to: 

 Dabaozi, Qinghai, a town in Chengbei District of Xi'ning, Qinghai, China
 Dabaozi, Hunan, a town in Jingzhou Miao and Dong Autonomous County, Hunan, China